Erythrocarpus may refer to:
Erythrocarpus Blume, a synonym of the euphorb genus Suregada
Erythrocarpus M.Roem, a synonym of the passionflower genus Adenia